Mihalj Mesaroš (27 July 1935 – 18 April 2017) was a Yugoslav/Serbian footballer.

Career
Born in Novi Bečej and nicknamed "Meske" he started his career at local side FK Jedinstvo Novi Bečej from where he moved to FK Proleter Zrenjanin playing back then in the Yugoslav Second League. Then he moves to the capital Belgrade and joins FK Partizan. He played 127 games and scored 57 goals for the black&whites, 43 games and 10 goals in the Yugoslav First League. Next he played for OFK Beograd, NK Rijeka and FK Sloboda Tuzla. In 1968, he moved to the United States and played with Los Angeles Toros in the NPSL, and next season the club changed its name to San Diego Toros and played in the NASL. Afterwards he returned to Yugoslavia and in 1974 he was back to the United States, this time playing with San Jose Earthquakes in the NASL.

References

External links
 Mihalj Meszaros at naslsoccer.blogspot.com

1935 births
2017 deaths
People from Novi Bečej
Serbian footballers
Yugoslav footballers
Association football forwards
FK Proleter Zrenjanin players
FK Partizan players
OFK Beograd players
FK Sloboda Tuzla players
HNK Rijeka players
Yugoslav First League players
Los Angeles Toros players
San Diego Toros players
San Jose Earthquakes (1974–1988) players
North American Soccer League (1968–1984) players
Expatriate soccer players in the United States